Masters of the Air is an upcoming American war drama miniseries based on the actions of the Eighth Air Force of the United States Army Air Forces during World War II. It is being produced by Apple Studios in cooperation with Playtone, Parliament of Owls, Amblin Television. The series will be released on Apple TV+.

Cast

Guest
Joanna Kulig as Paulina
Bel Powley as Alexandra "Sandra" Wingate
Lauren McQueen as Rose
David Nolden as Hans

Production

Reports of a third World War II based miniseries in the same vein as Band of Brothers and The Pacific developed by Tom Hanks and Steven Spielberg began in October 2012, focusing on United States Army Air Forces aircrews of the Eighth Air Force. In January 2013, HBO confirmed it was developing the miniseries, based on Donald L. Miller's book Masters of the Air: America's Bomber Boys Who Fought the Air War Against Nazi Germany.

In October 2019, it was reported that Apple had made a deal with Spielberg's and Hanks's respective production companies to stream the series exclusively on Apple TV+ instead of HBO. HBO confirmed that it decided not to move forward with the series in a statement. Deadline Hollywood reported the series contains ten episodes at a production cost of over $200 million, while The Hollywood Reporter said it contains nine episodes at a production cost of $250 million. The website Footsteps Research reported the series would focus on the 100th Bombardment Group of the Eighth Air Force.

In October 2020, Cary Joji Fukunaga was announced to be directing the first three episodes of the series. In February 2021, Austin Butler and Callum Turner were cast to star in the series. Anthony Boyle and Nate Mann joined the cast in March, with Raff Law, James Murray and Tommy Jessop added in April. Freddy Carter revealed his casting in a May interview, while set photos revealed Barry Keoghan was also cast. In June, Dee Rees was announced as directing episodes of the series. In July, Anna Boden and Ryan Fleck were also announced as directing episodes. Colleen Atwood will serve as costume designer.

In February 2021, it was reported that production in Britain had begun, at Dalton Barracks in Oxfordshire, England. Retrospective temporary 12 month planning permission has been applied for at Newland Park, Chalfont St Peter, following the construction of a WWII barracks on the site. Filming paused briefly in July due to positive COVID-19 tests. Production also occurred in Hemel Hempstead. The series used on-set virtual production by Lux Machina for cockpit scenes.

The series will be the first Apple TV+ series produced in-house.  In a November 2022 interview Playtone executive Kirk Saduski revealed that Masters of the Air will begin streaming mid-Spring 2023.

See also
12 O'Clock High (TV series)

References

External links
 
 

English-language television shows
Upcoming drama television series
Apple TV+ original programming
World War II television drama series
American military television series
Aviation television series
Television productions suspended due to the COVID-19 pandemic
Television series based on actual events
Television series by Amblin Entertainment
Television series by Playtone
Television shows based on non-fiction books
Television shows filmed in England
United States Army Air Forces
Television series about the United States Army